Donald Wayne Massey (born April 10, 1947) is an American country music artist and actor. He is best known for playing the role of country/rock music superstar Johnny Drummond on the American daytime soap opera One Life to Live from 1980 to 1984. Massey is also known for his musical collaboration with his wife, country music singer Charly McClain, with whom he charted four duets between 1985 and 1986. He released eleven singles of his own, but never reached the Top 40 alone.

Career
Massey was born in Glendale, California. A graduate of Brigham Young University, Massey had been working in the business world when he was unexpectedly "discovered" and cast in his first acting role as Johnny Drummond on One Life to Live in 1980. During this time, he also starred in a made-for-TV movie called Crossfire. Massey released his first record album Wayne Massey: One Life To Live in 1980, produced by Joel Diamond for Silver Blue Productions. It was also Joel Diamond who turned musical superstar Johnny Drummond on "One Life To Live" into a real music superstar. After leaving the soap opera One Life to Live in 1984, he pursued a singing and producing career in country music for several years. He toured with country singer Charly McClain and topped the charts with four hit duets, the highest-ranking of which was "With Just One Look in Your Eyes" (1985), a number 5 single from McClain's Radio Heart album. Two others — "You Are My Music, You Are My Song" and "When It's Down To Me And You" — were from the couple's 1986 duets album When Love Is Right. He charted nine solo singles between 1980 and 1986, but none reached Top 40, although he was nominated as the Academy of Country Music Top New Male Vocalist for his 1983 single "Say You'll Stay". His final singles "Shoot the Moon" and "Heaven in a Haystack" were released on Mercury Records in 1989, as was his solo album, Wayne Massey and Blackhawk. Massey left the recording industry in the 1990s.

Personal life
Massey was briefly married at age 22 (one son, Judd), and again later to his One Life to Live costar Andrea Evans from 1981 to 1983. He has been married to Charly McClain since July 1984.

Discography

Studio albums

Singles

Singles with Charly McClain

Awards
1983: Academy of Country Music - Top New Male Vocalist Nominee

References

American country singer-songwriters
American male singer-songwriters
Epic Records artists
Living people
Male actors from Glendale, California
MCA Records artists
Musicians from Glendale, California
Mercury Records artists
Place of birth missing (living people)
Polydor Records artists
Singer-songwriters from California
1947 births
Country musicians from California